Too Much Stereo is the sixth studio album by alternative rock band The Urge. It was released in 2000 through Immortal Records in cassette and CD format. The album produced two singles, “Too Much Stereo" and "Four Letters and Two Words", and sold 125,000 copies. An advance copy was released with different cover art. This was their last studio album before their disbandment in 2001, until their reunion in 2011 and their 2013 album, Galvanized.

Track listing

Personnel
All credits from Allmusic.
The Urge
Steve Ewing - vocals
Karl Grable - bass
Jerry Jost - guitars
John Pessoni - drums, percussion, background vocals
Bill Reiter - saxophone, organ
Matt Kwiatkowski - trombone

Other personnel
Jason Brennan - assistant engineer
Chris Fogel, Chris Lord-Alge - mixing
Steve Griffen - associate producer, drum Loop, editing, engineer, programming
Steve Kaplan, Howard Kalp, Matt Silva - assistant engineers
Clif Magness - composer for "Liar, Liar" , engineer, producer
Stephen Marcussen - mastering
Matt Silva - assistant engineer
Roger Sommers - engineer, mixing
Stephen Stickler - concept, photography
Jai Winding - organ

Charts

References

The Urge albums
2000 albums